Founded in 1961, the West Coast Railway Association (WCRA) is a non-profit society dedicated to preserving British Columbia's railway heritage. The society operates the Railway Museum of British Columbia and the CN Roundhouse & Conference Centre located in Squamish, BC. The museum is home to over 90 pieces of vintage railway equipment and is the second largest railway museum in Canada, while the Conference Centre is a 21,000 sqft event venue.

Notable pieces of the WCRA's collection include Royal Hudson No. 2860, and 1890s era business car "British Columbia".

The park operates several events throughout the year in which train rides are offered. Occasional excursions using WCRA equipment have also travelled throughout the province.

Volunteers from the WCRA also operate the Engine 374 Pavilion in Vancouver, British Columbia.

External links
West Coast Railway Association website

References

Heritage railways in British Columbia
Railway museums in British Columbia
Squamish, British Columbia
Sea-to-Sky Corridor